Dimitrios Voutsas (born 20 May 2000) is a Greek professional footballer who plays as a right-back for Evosmos.

References

2000 births
Living people
Greek footballers
Greece youth international footballers
Football League (Greece) players
Super League Greece 2 players
Ergotelis F.C. players
Association football defenders
Footballers from Thessaloniki